2-Hydroxy-4-(methylthio)butyric acid is an organic compound with the structural formula CH3SCH2CH2CH(OH)CO2H.  It is a white solid. In terms of functional groups, the molecule is a α-hydroxy carboxylic acid and a thioether. The compound is structurally related to the amino acid methionine by replacement of the amine with a hydroxy group. 

The compound is produced commercially in racemic form from acrolein by conjugate addition of methanethiol followed by formation and hydrolysis of a cyanohydrin. it is used as a substitute for methionine in animal feed. 

In nature, the compound is also an intermediate in the biosynthesis of 3-dimethylsulfoniopropionate, precursor to natural dimethyl sulfide.

References

Alpha hydroxy acids
Thioethers